Nicolas Potier de Novion (1618 – 1 September 1693) was a French magistrate of the Ancien Régime.

Potier de Novion was born into the Potier de Blancmesnil family, to André I Potier de Novion, president of parliament, and Catherine Cavelier.

1618 births
1693 deaths
Ancien Régime office-holders